Alapocas Run is a  long tributary to Brandywine Creek in New Castle County, Delaware.  This run drains a large portion of Alapocas Run State Park in the Wilmington, Delaware area.

See also
List of Delaware rivers

References

External links
Alapocas Run State Park

Rivers of Delaware
Rivers of New Castle County, Delaware
Tributaries of the Christina River